The 1971 South African Open was a combined men's and women's tennis tournament played on outdoor hard courts at the Ellis Park Tennis Stadium in Johannesburg, South Africa. It was the 68th edition of the tournament and was held from 5 April through 17 April 1971. Ken Rosewall and Margaret Court won the singles titles.

Finals

Men's singles
 Ken Rosewall defeated  Fred Stolle 6–4, 7–5, 3–6, 6–4

Women's singles
 Margaret Court defeated  Evonne Goolagong 6–3, 6–1

Men's doubles
 Ken Rosewall /  Fred Stolle defeated  Bob Hewitt /  Frew McMillan 5–7, 6–2, 6–1, 6–2

Women's doubles
 Margaret Court /  Evonne Goolagong defeated  Brenda Kirk /  Laura Rossouw 6–3, 6–2

Mixed's doubles
 Margaret Court /  Fred Stolle defeated  Ray Ruffels /  Pat Walkden 6–3, 7–6

References

South African Open
South African Open (tennis)
Open
April 1971 sports events in Africa
1970s in Johannesburg
Sports competitions in Johannesburg